DMBMPP, or 2-(2,5-dimethoxy-4-bromobenzyl)-6-(2-methoxyphenyl)piperidine, is a  2-benzylpiperidine analog of the hallucinogenic N-benzylphenethylamine 25B-NBOMe and was discovered in 2011 by Jose Juncosa in the group of David E. Nichols at Purdue University. DMBPP differs from 25B-NBOMe by having a piperidine ring conformed to the amine, making for a more rigid molecular structure than that of the open-chain 25B-NBOMe. The presence of the piperidine ring introduces two stereocenters, thus, four stereoisomers of this compound can be made.

Pharmacology
The (S,S)-isomer (2S,6S-DMBMPP) is the most interesting scientifically as it is the most selective agonist for the human 5-HT2A receptor yet discovered, with a Ki of 2.5 nM at the human 5-HT2A receptor and with 124-fold  selectivity for 5-HT2A over the structurally similar 5-HT2C-receptor. Together with 25CN-NBOH, 2S,6S-DMBMPP is the only known 5-HT2A agonist to exhibit this level of selectivity.

See also 
 25CN-NBOH
 25B-NBOMe

References 

2-Benzylpiperidines
2C (psychedelics)
5-HT2A agonists
Bromoarenes